Willie Beatrice Barrow (née Taplin; December 7, 1924 – March 12, 2015) was an American civil rights activist and minister. Barrow was the co-founder of Operation PUSH, which was named Operation Breadbasket at the time of its creation alongside Rev. Jesse Jackson. In 1984, Barrow became the first woman executive director of a civil rights organization, serving as Push's CEO. Barrow was the godmother of President Barack Obama.

Biography
Barrow was born Willie Beatrice Taplin in Burton, Texas, to Nelson, a minister, and Octavia Taplin, one of seven children. When she was 12, she organized a demonstration with fellow students to protest that white students were allowed to ride the bus, but black students had to walk to school. Barrow confronted the bus driver and demanded that he let her fellow students ride. When the bus driver confronted her about it she said "Y'all can kill me if you want to. But I'm tired." When Barrow turned 16, she moved to Portland, Oregon, to study at the Warner Pacific Theological Seminary (now Warner Pacific College). While still a student, Barrow and a group of black residents helped build one of the first black Churches of God in the city; she was ordained as a minister after graduation. She started working as a welder during World War II at the Swan Island Shipyard, where she met Clyde Barrow, whom she married in 1945 in Washington.

The couple moved to Chicago in the early 1940s, and Barrow attended the Moody Bible Institute to further her call to service. They lived on the South Side, and Barrow ran the youth choir at Langley Avenue Church of God. According to Barrow, she was approached by the minister to do some additional organizing for civil rights movement actions. Barrow campaigned for Harold Washington who became the first Black Mayor of Chicago in 1983. In 1984 and 1988 she worked for Jesse Jackson's Presidential campaign.

Awards and achievements 
 2014 Champion of Freedom Award
 2012 Bill Berry Award
 Woman of the Year of Chicago 1969
 Image award from League of Black Women
 Christian Women's Conference History Makers Award
 Doctor of Divinity Degree from Monrovia.
 Libreria and Leadership Certificate from Harvard University
 Indo-American Democratic Organization's Humanitarian of the Year Award
 C.F. Stradford Award for her lifelong work on the front lines of the civil rights movement.
  2006 Black Heritage Awardee

Organizing 
In the 1950s she worked with Martin Luther King and other Chicago ministers and activists as a field organizer for the Southern Christian Leadership Conference. In the 1960s she helped organize the Chicago chapter of Operation Breadbasket with Rev. Jesse Jackson. She opposed U.S. involvement in the Vietnam War and led a delegation to North Vietnam in 1968. She joined the National Urban League in 1943 and the National Council of Negro Women in 1945. She was the godmother of President Barack Obama. In 1973 she protested social services cuts by the Nixon administration.

Intersectional activism
Barrow additionally was an activist for the LGBT community, which included fighting for HIV/AIDS victims. She also advocated for fair labor practices, took an anti-Vietnam war stance, and was vocal about women's rights. In a 1987 interview on Chicago Tonight she said, "You see ministers, they would rather have a minister who could not articulate and perhaps may not have even been called ... than to have an articulate woman that knows something about the rebirth of Christ and knows about the natural birth and the new birth. They would rather try to have a man articulate than a woman. ... As Jesse [Jackson] grew, his vision grew. Anytime that there was a committee was formed, it would be all men. I'd say 'Jesse, you haven an unbalanced committee. You've got to have some women.' ... He kept putting women on committees, kept making them managers ... then it became a habit, a part of his vision."

Significant events attended 
1963 March on Washington
Bloody Sunday (1965)
 She participated in the Project AIDS Memorial Quilt as acknowledged by The President and First Lady.
 State of Illinois Center against the school strike on Sept. 22, 1987 
 Democratic National Convention in Denver on Aug. 26, 2008 as a superdelegate
 2001 March against U.S. Naval bombing in Vieques, Puerto Rico
 Million Family March
 She spoke on January 6, 1994 at a  Violence Against Women forum. Her stance was that it starts within the family and crosses racial boundaries and financial boundaries.

Later years and death 
Each Saturday she would participate in demonstrations and she participated weekly in Rainbow/PUSH's events. She helped many people by writing checks to cover college tuition for them. She mentored over a hundred people in PUSH, helping them to move on to the next stage of the movement.  Barrow was co-pastor of the Vernon Park Church of God in Chicago. She helped raise money for assisted living development in the south and to fund after school programs. She had focused on gun violence in Chicago and changes to the Voting Rights Act that were taking away rights that the Selma marches helped create. Barrow died of respiratory failure on March 12, 2015, at age 90 in Chicago.  Following her death, A tribute to her life was held at Operation PUSH headquarters ; Her funeral at her church Vernon Park Church of God.

See also

Notes

References

External links

1924 births
2015 deaths
People from Chicago
Clergy from Portland, Oregon
People from Washington County, Texas
African-American activists
Activists for African-American civil rights
American anti–Vietnam War activists
American anti-racism activists
Central Conservatory of Music alumni
Warner Pacific University alumni
Moody Bible Institute alumni
University of Liberia alumni
Activists from Texas
African-American history in Portland, Oregon
African-American history of Oregon
21st-century African-American people